Good Side Bad Side is the second album by the Chicago hip hop group Crucial Conflict. It was released on October 20, 1998, through Pallas Records, Raw Dope Productions and Universal Records. Recording sessions took place at the Barn, Chicago Recording Company and Neighbourhood Watch Studios in Chicago. It features a couple of diss tracks towards Bone Thugs-N-Harmony, and guest appearances from Tear Da Club Up Thugs, Do Or Die and R. Kelly.

The album peaked at number 38 on the Billboard 200 albums chart and at number 10 on the Top R&B/Hip-Hop Albums chart in the United States.

Critical reception
The Chicago Tribune thought that "producer-rapper Wild Style's mesmerizing musical compositions may be the group's strongest asset ... Dubbed the 'Rodeo' style, the work of the Windy City beatsmith contains insistent keyboard, twangy guitar and dynamic drum patterns that explode from the speakers." The Chicago Reader wrote that "the relentlessly hysterical, nasal speed-rapping turns the 75-minute CD into a suffocating sonic beatdown."

Track listing

Personnel

Crucial Conflict
Corey "Coldhard" Johnson – main artist, vocals
Wondosas "Kilo" Martin – main artist, vocals
Marrico "Never" King – main artist, vocals
Ralph "Wildstyle" Leverston – main artist, producer (tracks: 1-16, 18), mixing (tracks: 1-12, 14-18), engineering (tracks: 6, 12), assistant engineering (track 14), mastering (tracks: 1-4, 6-11, 13, 15-18)
Additional vocalists
Paul Duane Beauregard – vocals (track 5)
Jordan Michael Houston – vocals (track 5)
Ricky Dunigan – vocals (track 5)
Darnell Smith – vocals (track 12)
Dennis Round – vocals (track 12)
Anthony Round – vocals (track 12)
Robert Sylvester Kelly – vocals & producer (track 17)
T-Babe – vocals (tracks: 1, 7, 9, 13)
Clyde – vocals (track 1)
PMP – vocals (track 15)
BHlunt – vocals (track 16)

Technical
QBall – scratches (track 4), mixing (tracks: 1, 2, 4, 6-10, 14-16, 18), assistant engineering (track 6)
Frankie – guitar (track 11)
Chris Steinmetz – engineering (tracks: 1, 7-9, 11, 15-18)
Tom Carlyle – engineering (tracks: 2, 4, 10)
Jeff Lang – engineering (tracks: 3, 5, 12-14)
Fred Hahn – assistant engineering (tracks: 1, 2, 4, 7, 8, 10, 15-18)
Bill Douglass – assistant engineering (tracks: 5, 12-14)
Jason B. – assistant engineering (tracks: 9, 11)
Matt Judah – assistant engineering (tracks: 17, 18)
Blake C – assistant engineering (track 9)
Dennis Ferrante – mastering (tracks: 1-4, 6-11, 13, 15-18)
Sean Sutton – mastering (tracks: 5, 12, 14)
Fred Brathwaite – executive producer, art direction
Roy "Black Prince" Cormier – executive producer
Torino "Neno Blade" Norris – executive producer
Shorty Capone – executive producer
Eric Russ – art direction
Daniel Hastings – photography

Chart history

References

External links 
 
 Good Side Bad Side by Crucial Conflict on iTunes

1998 albums
Crucial Conflict albums
Universal Records albums
Albums produced by R. Kelly